The 2014–15 season will be Dempo's eighth season in the I-League and 47th season in existence.

Transfers
Dempo began their squad changes for the 2014–15 season as early as April when they signed Tata Football Academy graduate Vinit Rai.

In

References

Dempo
Dempo SC seasons